Bregovina is a village in the municipality of Prokuplje, Serbia. According to the 2002 census, the village has a population of 70 people.

The Drengrad archaeological site located in the village, which includes ruins of a 6th-century fort, is part of the Cultural Heritage of Serbia list, inscribed in 1982–83.

References

Populated places in Toplica District